Journey to Atlantis is the name shared by three Water Coasters located at SeaWorld theme parks. These attractions, while different from one another, tell a similar story of a trip to the mythical land of Atlantis. Each one combines roller coaster elements, such as chain lift hills and steep drops, with boat-based attraction elements, such as splash-down landings. All three attractions were designed by Mack Rides of Germany.

SeaWorld Orlando

The original Journey to Atlantis made its debut on April 17, 1998 at SeaWorld Orlando. It is one of the six roller coasters at the park. Along with Wild Arctic, it was one of the park's only thrill rides until the arrival of Kraken in 2000. The four other roller coasters came after: Super Grover's Box Car Derby in 2006, Manta in 2009, Mako in 2016, and Ice Breaker in 2022.

Journey to Atlantis features a small aquarium exhibit, "Jewels of the Sea", in its gift shop exit area. Inside, guests will find aquaria built into the floor and the ceiling of the exhibit, along with more traditional aquaria.

During its seasonal maintenance in March 2017, SeaWorld greatly altered the ride's theme; all effects featuring Allura the Evil Mermaid and Hermes the Fiber-Optic Seahorse (audio and lighting) were removed. The musical score and sound effects that once narrated the emotional arc of the ride disappeared too, and the ride's score was replaced with a continuous loop of Rick McKee's original score (borrowed from the park's former cirque-style show, A'lure – Call of the Ocean) with celebratory exterior music.

The original version of the ride received mixed reviews, including complaints from parents that some scenes frightened small children and may have been too dark and scary for a family-friendly attraction. The ride was sometimes criticized for its intensity — much like the Magic Kingdom's "Snow White's Adventures," at Walt Disney World.

Vehicle design
The ride vehicles on Journey to Atlantis are boats with wheels on the bottom sides. Each boat carries eight passengers, arranged into four rows with two passengers each. Two lap bars secure both passengers in the row.

Track layout
Journey to Atlantis begins as the boat is propelled via friction drives into a water flume meant to resemble an underwater canal. A siren beckons the boat closer until the mythical realm of Atlantis comes into view. The boat enters the city and all appears well, but soon the siren's true form is revealed, and the boat is carried up and out of the temple on a roller coaster chain lift hill. After a left-hand U-turn the boat starts up a second lift hill, entering a dry flume at the top of the hill that carries the boat to the large splash-down drop. The attraction's on-ride camera captures the boat's photograph as it slides down to the water below.

The boat makes a right-hand U-turn leading to a short drop with a large splash and a final lift hill that leads back into the temple for one final encounter with the siren. At the top of this lift hill, the boat is now on a roller-coaster-type track. The boat escapes from the siren into the darkness, down a spiraling drop to the left before swooping up and landing in a final splash-down pool. The boat makes one final U-turn to the right before returning to the station.

SeaWorld San Diego

The second Atlantis opened in 2004 at SeaWorld San Diego. This version lacks the large interior scenes that the Orlando version includes; but makes up for it with the addition of a much larger roller coaster ride. Also, the boats on this version have individual lap-bars.

Track layout
Riders advance out of the station slowly onto the chain lift hill that is covered in fog machines, which give the illusion of climbing up water. At the top of the lift hill, riders make a full U-turn on a roller coaster track, which wraps around the elevator tower which stands at a height of 95 feet, while traversing a small hump. This turn offers the riders a view of the main roller coaster portion and parts of the park, in which boats emerge above the U-turn. The boat heads toward the 83 foot tall plunge tower, which bares an arched portico with fountain pouring down directly onto the tracks. The boats slip under, plunging down a  flume channel into a pool of water. During the plunge, photos are taken of riders. The boat then makes a left-handed U-turn in the water pool and meanders through the pond gently. The boat then enters the plunge tower building at the base. The building is dark inside. The boats enter a room which lights up dimly and begins to flood. (Water comes through crevices in the wall to achieve the effect). The boats roll out of the room into the darkness and onto a special track that works like an elevator, carrying two boats simultaneously. The elevator rocks from side to side while traveling up, as though being pushed by an ocean current. The elevator stops to reach the maximum height position on the ride's course. The boats drop down a 70-foot, 270° curved drop and rise element, followed by a small block brake section. The boat then drops again into another banked hill, followed by a banked bunny hop which lands into another pool of water. The boats then meander through the pool and up a small lift hill to the loading area. A sliding switch track enables high-capacity, faster loading and unloading process.

SeaWorld San Antonio

The newest version of Atlantis opened on May 11, 2007 at SeaWorld San Antonio. First announced in August 2006, this version is based on a different model than its cousins. Although initial plans had called for a more elaborate indoor station and "towers" to enclose the ride's two turntables, SeaWorld opted to reduce the number of drops and turns. Thus, this version more closely resembles a traditional Shoot-the-Chutes boat ride. It is based on the "SuperSplash" devised by Mack Rides.

Track layout
Upon leaving the station, riders ascend a  lift hill. Once at the top, the boat enters one of two turntables that allows riders a 360° view of the park. After one full rotation, the boat is positioned to pass through its reverse camel back backwards. The second turntable provides riders with an additional 360° view of the park before the boat finally dives through a building and into the water. Additionally, SeaWorld added walkways and a "viewing area" next to the ride's splash zone and queue, enabling guests the option to get soaked. The boat makes a U-turn before climbing back into the station.

See also 

 Storm Coaster

References

Water Coaster (roller coaster)
Water rides
Water rides manufactured by Mack Rides
Roller coasters operated by SeaWorld Parks & Entertainment
Roller coasters in Texas
Roller coasters in Florida
Roller coasters introduced in 2007
SeaWorld Orlando
SeaWorld San Antonio
Mermaids in popular culture
SeaWorld San Diego
Amusement rides introduced in 1998
Amusement rides introduced in 2004
Amusement rides introduced in 2007
Animatronic attractions
1998 establishments in Florida
2004 establishments in California
2007 establishments in Texas